King's Cliffe railway station is a former railway station in King's Cliffe, Northamptonshire.

The station was opened on 1 November 1879 and closed to passengers on 6 June 1966. On that date the section from Rugby (Midland) to Kings Cliffe was closed completely, but the line east of Kings Cliffe station remained open for goods traffic. On 3 June 1968 Kings Cliffe station was closed to goods along with the track to Nassington station where a private siding and the line to Yarwell Junction at Wansford remained in use until 1971 to serve a sand and gravel quarry.

References

Disused railway stations in Northamptonshire
Former London and North Western Railway stations
Railway stations in Great Britain opened in 1879
Railway stations in Great Britain closed in 1966
Beeching closures in England
North Northamptonshire